Brizzolara may refer to:

People
Carlo Brizzolara, Author
Diane Brizzolara, Author of multiple stories from Weird Tales
Emer Brizzolara, Member of And Also the Trees band
John Brizzolara, Author of multiple stories from Weird Tales
 (1868–1937), Italian sculptor
Ralph Brizzolara (1895–1972), American football executive
Thomas L. Brizzolara, Borough Council member in Norwood, New Jersey
Tony Brizzolara (born 1957), Major League Baseball player

Other
Brizzolara Creek, Tributary of Stenner Creek, flows through Cal Poly campus
Brizzolara, Frazioni of Borzonasca
Brizzolara Family Foundation